Ashna Khvor (also Romanized as Āshnā Khvor, Āshenākhūr, Āshnā Khowr, and Ashnokhur; also known as Ashnakhor) is a village in Ashna Khvor Rural District, in the Central District of Khomeyn County, Markazi Province, Iran. At the 2006 census, its population was 723, in 182 families.

References 

Populated places in Khomeyn County